Taurus Rising is an Australian soap opera produced by the Reg Grundy Organisation for the Nine Network in 1982. Originally intended by the network to be a replacement for The Sullivans, the series was one of a number of attempts to provide an Australian alternative to the glossy American supersoaps Dallas and Dynasty and featured two wealthy Sydney-based feuding families, the Brents and the Drysdales. To this end, it represented something of a stylistic departure for Grundy's. Unlike most other Australian soap operas which were recorded on videotape, Taurus Rising was shot entirely on film. Series began at 8.30pm time-slot in a 2 hr movie pilot and continued for a couple of weeks on Tuesday nights due to decline in ratings was delegated to Friday nights at 10pm by the time of the TV series finale during 1982. TV series was never screened on Nine network since the original screening.

It cost $2 million to make.

Taurus Rising proved to be an expensive failure after it failed to win an audience and was cancelled after 21 episodes. The series did later prove popular in international markets and was subsequently sold to American cable television, marketed as a 21-part "miniseries".

Cast

References

  Mercardo, A., 2004, Super Aussie soaps. North Melbourne: Pluto Press.

External links
 

Australian television soap operas
Nine Network original programming
Television shows set in New South Wales
1982 Australian television series debuts
1982 Australian television series endings
English-language television shows
Television series produced by The Reg Grundy Organisation